Matheus Ferraz Pereira (born 12 February 1985) is a Brazilian professional footballer who plays as a central defender for Fluminense FC.

In 2014, at 29 years of age, Ferraz embraced Asian football by signing for FC Tokyo of Japan.

Honours
Brasiliense
Campeonato Brasiliense: 2008

Criciúma
Campeonato Catarinense: 2013

América Mineiro
Campeonato Brasileiro Série B: 2017

Fluminense
Taça Guanabara: 2022
Campeonato Carioca: 2022

References

External links
 
 

1985 births
Living people
People from São José do Rio Pardo
Brazilian footballers
Association football defenders
Campeonato Brasileiro Série A players
Campeonato Brasileiro Série B players
Campeonato Brasileiro Série D players
Santos FC players
América Futebol Clube (SP) players
Clube do Remo players
Brasiliense Futebol Clube players
Esporte Clube Noroeste players
Associação Desportiva São Caetano players
Mirassol Futebol Clube players
Criciúma Esporte Clube players
Boa Esporte Clube players
Sport Club do Recife players
Goiás Esporte Clube players
América Futebol Clube (MG) players
Fluminense FC players
AEL Limassol players
FC Tokyo players
Brazilian expatriate footballers
Brazilian expatriate sportspeople in Cyprus
Brazilian expatriate sportspeople in Japan
Expatriate footballers in Cyprus
Expatriate footballers in Japan
União São João Esporte Clube players
Footballers from São Paulo (state)